is a railway station located in the town of Fukaura, Aomori Prefecture, Japan, operated by the East Japan Railway Company (JR East).

Lines

Station layout
Oirase  Station has one ground-level island platform, of which one side is in use, serving a single bi-directional track. The station is unattended, and is managed from Goshogawara Station. There is a small weather shelter on the platform but no station building.

History
Oirase Station was opened on December 13, 1934 as a station on the Japan National Railways (JNR). With the privatization of the JNR on April 1, 1987, it came under the operational control of JR East.

Surrounding area

See also
 List of Railway Stations in Japan

References

External links

   

Stations of East Japan Railway Company
Railway stations in Aomori Prefecture
Gonō Line
Fukaura, Aomori
Railway stations in Japan opened in 1934